This is a list of notable Turkish artists.

A
 Kuzgun Acar (1928-1976), sculptor
 Haluk Akakçe (born 1970), contemporary artist
 Onay Akbaş (born 1964), contemporary artist
 Ahmet Ziya Akbulut (1869–1938), painter
 Mehmet Aksoy (sculptor) (born 1939), sculptor 
 Halil Altındere (born 1971), contemporary artist
 Hüseyin Bahri Alptekin (1957-2007), contemporary artist
 Avni Arbaş (1919–2003), painter
 Burak Arıkan (born 1976), contemporary artist
 Hale Asaf (1905–1938), painter
 Tomur Atagok (born 1939), painter and professor
 Ruzen Atakan (born 1966), Turkish-Cypriot painter

B
 İbrahim Balaban (1921-2019), painter
 Bedri Baykam (born 1957), painter
 Turgut Berkes (1953-2018), rock musician, painter and writer
 Osman Hamdi Bey (1842–1910), painter, archaeologist and curator

C
 Taner Ceylan (born 1967), contemporary artist
 Hüseyin Çağlayan (born 1970), contemporary artist and fashion designer
 Sevgi Çağal (born 1957), painter and sculptor
 Nevin Çokay (1930–2012), painter
 Adnan Çoker (born 1927), painter
 Nusret Çolpan (1952–2008), painter, architect and miniature artist
 Antonio Cosentino (1970), painter, sculptor, contemporary artist
 Gürkan Coşkun (born 1941), painter also known as Komet

D
 Şevket Dağ (1876–1944), painter
 Barış Dilaver (born 1975), ballet dancer, creator and filmmaker
 Abidin Dino (1913–1993), painter 
 Burhan Doğançay (1929–2013), painter, photographer and former soccer player
 Ipek Duben (born 1941), contemporary visual artist

E
 Nese Erdok (born 1940), painter
 Ayşe Erkmen (born 1949), sculptor
 Bedri Rahmi Eyüboğlu (1913–1975), painter and poet

F
 Ertuğrul Oğuz Fırat (1923–2014), painter, poet and composer

G
 Leyla Gediz (born 1974), painter
 Erkan Geniş (born 1943), artist
 Bahadır Gökay (born 1955), painter and teacher
 Genco Gulan (born 1969), contemporary artist
 Hatice Güleryüz (born 1968), contemporary artist
 Serkan Günes (born 1980), photographer
 Nazmi Ziya Güran (1881–1937), impressionist painter
 Mehmet Güreli (born 1949), writer, painter, director and musician

H
 Haydar Hatemi (born 1945), painter and sculptor

İ
 Hülya Vurnal İkizgül (born 1966), mosaicist, sculptor and ceramic artist
 Erdal İnci (born 1983), new media artist
 Namık İsmail (1866–1902), painter

K
 Müfide Kadri (1890–1912), painter 
 Gülsün Karamustafa (born 1946), contemporary artist, filmmaker
 Ömer Ali Kazma (born 1971), contemporary artist
 Nur Koçak (born 1941), contemporary artist
 Servet Koçyiğit (born 1971), contemporary artist

L
 Abdulcelil Levni (1680–1732), Ottoman court painter and miniaturist
 Hüseyin Avni Lifij (1886–1927), painter

M
 Ali Miharbi (born 1976), contemporary artist

O
 Füsun Onur (born 1938), painter, sculptor
 Tankut Öktem (1940–2007), sculptor especially of monumental works
 Setenay Özbek (born 1961), artist
 Emre Ozdemir (born 1981) cartoonist
 Serkan Özkaya (born 1973), contemporary artist

Ö
 Ahmet Öğüt (born 1981), contemporary artist

P
 Ferik İbrahim Paşa (1815–1891), one of the first Western-style painters 
 Halil Paşa (1857–1939), impressionist painter 
 Hüseyin Zekai Paşa (1860–1919), painter
 Şeker Ahmet Paşa (1841–1907), painter of nature-related subjects
 Hayal Pozanti (born 1983), artist

R
 Hoca Ali Riza (1858–1939), painter

S
 Ibrahim Safi (1898–1983), impressionist painter
 Deniz Sağdıç (born 1982), painter
 Gizem Saka (born 1978), painter
 Sencer Sari (born 1982), ceramics and glass artist 
 Fikret Mualla Saygı (1904–1967), avant-garde painter
 Muhittin Sebati (1901–1932), painter and sculptor
 Erinç Seymen (1980), painter
 Süleyman Seyyid (1842–1913), painter
 Kamil Sonad (born 1914), plaster sculptor, especially of female nudes
 Sevil Soyer (born 1950), contemporary painter and installation artist
 Setenay Özbek (born 1961), painter and writer

T
 Hakan Topal (born 1972), contemporary artist
 Sali Turan (born 1949), modern painter
 Canan Tolon (born 1955), contemporary painter

Y
 Nil Yalter (born 1938), contemporary artist
 Pınar Yolaçan (born 1981), photographer
 Metin Yurdanur (born 1951), sculptor

Z
 Sarkis Zabunyan (born 1938), contemporary artist known as "Sarkis"
 Fahrelnissa Zeid (1901–1991), painter, collage and glass artist

References 

List
Turkish
Artists